Rori may refer to:

 Rori, a fictional moon from the Star Wars franchise that orbits Naboo
 Rorikon, or Lolicon, Japanese slang for "Lolita complex"
 Rori, an abbreviation for the given name Aurora
 Rori Donaghy, human rights activist
 Charanjeet Singh Rori (b. 1969), Indian politician
 Rori, a Belgian pop artist, known from her single 'Docteur'

See also 
 Raury (born 1996), American musician
 Rory (disambiguation)
 Rohri, a city in Pakistan